Clarence Wyly Turner (October 22, 1866 –March 23, 1939) was an American politician who served in the United States Congress as a  member of the United States House of Representatives from Tennessee.

Biography
Turner was born on October 22, 1866 on a farm near Clydeton, in Humphreys County, Tennessee the son of Charles N. and Hettie B. Turner. He attended the public schools, a preparatory school in Edgewood in Dickson County, Tennessee, and National Normal Institute in Lebanon, Ohio. He graduated from the law department of Northern Indiana Normal School at Valparaiso, Indiana in 1904. He was admitted to the bar the same year and commenced practice at Waverly, Tennessee, in Humphreys County. He was also the editor of the Waverly Sentinel.

Career
The chairman of the Democratic committee of Humphreys County for fifteen years, Turner was also a member of the Tennessee Senate in 1900, 1901, and from 1909 to 1912. He was a delegate to the Democratic National Committee in 1920. He was elected mayor of Waverly, Tennessee in 1920, and also worked as a city attorney.

Elected as a Democrat to Sixty-seventh Congress by the Tennessee's 7th congressional district to fill the vacancy caused by the death of Lemuel P. Padgett, Turner served from November 7, 1922 to March 3, 1923.  He was not a candidate in 1922 for re-election to the Sixty-eighth Congress.

Turner returned to Waverly, Tennessee and engaged in banking and agricultural pursuits. He served as the county judge of Humphreys County from 1924 to 1933. He was elected to the Seventy-third and to the three succeeding Congresses by Tennessee's 6th congressional district. He served from March 4, 1933 until his death in Washington, D.C. on March 23, 1939.

Death
After his death in Washington, D.C. on March 23, 1939, Turner's remains were transported and he is interred in Marable Cemetery in Waverly, Tennessee.

See also
 List of United States Congress members who died in office (1900–49)

References

External links
 
 

"Memorial services held in the House of Representatives of the United States, together with remarks presented in eulogy of Clarence Wily Turner, late a representative from Tennessee frontispiece 1939"

1866 births
1939 deaths
Mayors of places in Tennessee
Heads of county government in Tennessee
Democratic Party Tennessee state senators
Valparaiso University alumni
Democratic Party members of the United States House of Representatives from Tennessee
People from Humphreys County, Tennessee
People from Waverly, Tennessee